Neza-e Kuchek (also Romanized as Nezā‘-e Kūchek; also known as Nezā‘-e Soflá and Qal‘eh Kohneh) is a village in Mishan Rural District, Mahvarmilani District, Mamasani County, Fars Province, Iran. At the 2006 census, its population was 24, in 6 families.

References 

Populated places in Mamasani County